Captain, We're Sinking is an American punk band from Scranton, Pennsylvania. They released three full-length albums. Singer Bobby Barnett is the brother of Greg Barnett who is one of the two singers in The Menzingers. Former drummer Mike May, formerly of Tigers Jaw, is the brother of The Menzingers' second singer Tom May. Leo Vergnetti, Bobby Barnett, Greg Barnett, Mike May, and Adam McIlwee, formerly of Tigers Jaw, had membership of the former ska punk band Kos-Mos of Scranton, Pennsylvania.  They announced on Facebook that they were no longer an active band on February 12, 2018

Members
Bob Barnett – vocals, guitar
Leo Vergnetti – vocals, guitar
Bass Player – bass guitar
Bill Orender – drums

Past members
Mike May – drums
Roberto Acosta – drums
Chad Tissue - drums
Zack (Rug) Charette - bass

Discography
Albums
The Animals Are Out (2007)
The Future Is Cancelled (2013)
The King of No Man (2017)

EPs and splits
Captain, We're Sinking / Spraynard (2008)
It's a Trap! (2009)
Timeshares / Captain, We're Sinking (2010)
With Joe Riley (2011)
Dowsing / Haverford / Run Forever / Captain, We're Sinking (2013)

Compilations
Captain, We're Sinking (2015)

References

External links
 Official website
 Facebook
 Twitter

Punk rock groups from Pennsylvania
Run for Cover Records artists
Musicians from Scranton, Pennsylvania